Pustite me da ga vidim (English: Allow Me to See Him), also known as To Miki (English: Yes Mickey), is the third studio album by Serbian singer Ceca. It was released in 1990. Unlike her previous two albums, it was released LP and MC, as well as on CD (with twelve bonus tracks from the first two albums.)

Track listing
To, Miki
Pustite me da ga vidim
Cipelice
Lako je tebi
Drugarice prokletnice
Sve u svoje vreme
Ne daj me
Eh, teško meni

References

1990 albums
Ceca (singer) albums